The sixth season of Australian Idol premiered on Sunday, 24 August 2008, on Network Ten. The season finale aired live on Sunday, 23 November 2008. The winner was Wes Carr with Luke Dickens as runner-up.

Changes to Format
Kyle Sandilands, Ian Dickson, and Marcia Hines returned as judges, however long term judge Mark Holden left to pursue other interests. Andrew G was temporarily absent while he prepared for his wedding and Ricki-Lee Coulter is acting as a new back-stage host. The London auditions featured guest judges Tina Arena and Darren Hayes.

Also for the second time on an Idol contest, the format for eliminations in the Top 12 round will be different. In the new result nights, the bottom 3 of the week will be announced first and the voting line will be opened again for viewers to vote for their favourite in the bottom 3. Music Idol, the Bulgarian version of Idol, were the first to use this new format in their second season. New Zealand Idol season 3 used a similar format for the second week of the finals, but dropped it afterwards.

Process

Regional auditions phase

Locations
The Auditions were held in the following cities:

^ These auditions were not filmed, with successful contestants going to capital city of the respective state for their second tier audition.
Auditioning contestants are required to be between the ages 16 and 30 on 1 July 2008 (born between 2 July 1978 and 2 July 1992).

Registrations were also conducted online, although not mandatory, allowed users to enter a draw of $2,000.

Semi-finals
From 1 to 4 September the Semi-final rounds aired on television, allowing viewers to vote. The Wildcard Performance Show was held on Sunday, 7 September, with results on 8 September.

List of the semi-finalists below.

* Grafanakis later auditioned for the second series of The X Factor (Australia), where she finished in 9th place.

Weekly Song Themes

Top 12 Finalists

Wesley Carr

Wes Carr is a 26-year-old from Bondi, New South Wales. Born in Adelaide, South Australia, Wes Carr moved to Bondi as a 15-year-old. Before he auditioned for Australian Idol, Wes Carr performed and had regular resident gigs around Sydney. 
On 23 November 2008, Wes Carr was announced the winner of Australian Idol 2008.

"Times Like These" by Foo Fighters – (Top 24)
"Beautiful Day" by U2 – (Top 12)
"Dancing in the Dark" by Bruce Springsteen – (Top 11)
"Friday on My Mind" by The Easybeats – (Top 10)
"Fernando" by ABBA – (Top 9)
"Desire" by U2 – (Top 8)
"If I Were A Carpenter" by The Four Tops – (Top 7)
"Jumpin' Jack Flash" by The Rolling Stones – (Top 6)
"Black or White" by Michael Jackson TOUCHDOWN! (from Marcia Hines and Jermaine Jackson) – (Top 5)
"When You Were Young" by The Killers – (Top 4)
"What a Wonderful World" by Louis Armstrong – (Top 4) Bottom 2
"Easy" by Faith No More – (Top 3)
"Get Back" by The Beatles TOUCHDOWN! (from Dicko) and TV Throw (from Kyle Sandilands) – (Top 3)
"White Noise" by The Living End – (Top 2)
"You" by Wes Carr – (Top 2)

Luke Dickens
Luke Dickens (born 7 June 1982) is from Young, New South Wales. Before he auditioned, Luke Dickens was a sheep shearer and had taught himself how to play the guitar. He was announced runner-up to Wes Carr on 23 November 2008.  Luke has gone on to release 3 albums (Underdog (2010), Devil in the Wind (2011) & After The Rain (2019)).    After The Rain topped the ARIA Australian Country Artist Album Chart and also hit No. 5 on the ARIA Country Album Chart and Top 50 all genres. 
"Mustang Sally" by Mack Rice – (Top 24)
"Angels" by Robbie Williams – (Wildcard)
"Feelin' Alright" by Joe Cocker – (Top 12)
"Jack and Diane" by John Mellencamp – (Top 11)
"Flame Trees" by Cold Chisel – (Top 10)
"Knowing Me, Knowing You" by ABBA – (Top 9)
"Are You Gonna Go My Way" by Lenny Kravitz – (Top 8)
"My Girl" by Temptations – (Top 7)
"Honky Tonk Woman" by The Rolling Stones – (Top 6) Bottom 2
"The Way You Make Me Feel" by Michael Jackson – (Top 5)
"With Arms Wide Open" by Creed – (Top 4)
"One of These Nights" by The Eagles – (Top 4)
"Stuck in the Middle" by Stealers Wheel – (Top 3)
"I Guess That's Why They Call It the Blues" by Elton John – (Top 3)
"Turn the Page" by Bob Seger – (Top 2)
"When We Hear Hallelujah" – by Luke Dickens – (Top 2)

Mark Spano
Mark Spano is a 26-year-old from Brighton, Victoria. He is of Italian Heritage. Mark Spano fronted band The Need for seven years, but had to stop after losing his voice due to polyp in his vocal cords. During his 2-year recovery, Mark Spano worked as a labourer until he auditioned for Australian Idol. Spano was eliminated during the Top 3 results night.

"Come Said The Boy" by Mondo Rock – (Top 24)
"Never Tear Us Apart" by INXS – (Top 12)
"I Want to Know What Love Is" by Foreigner – (Top 11)
"Age of Reason" by John Farnham – (Top 10)
"Waterloo" by ABBA – (Top 9)
"Sex on Fire" by The Kings of Leon – (Top 8)
"You Keep Me Hangin' On" by The Supremes – (Top 7) Bottom 2
"Angie" by The Rolling Stones – (Top 6) TOUCHDOWN! (from Dicko)
"Bad" by Michael Jackson – (Top 5) Bottom 2
"Baby Did a Bad, Bad Thing" by Chris Isaak – (Top 4)
"Everybody Hurts" by R.E.M. – (Top 4)
"Bad Day" by Fuel – (Top 3)
"Smooth" by Carlos Santana & Rob Thomas – (Top 3) Eliminated 17 November 2008

Teale Jakubenko
Teale Jakubenko is a 22-year-old from Yatala, Queensland. Born in Gold Coast, Queensland, Teale Jakubenko recently toured with renowned Australian singer Wendy Matthews. Jakubenko was eliminated during the Top 4 results night.  Teale was placed in the Bottom 3 six times including elimination and therefore has been placed there the most times out of any contestant in the history of Australian Idol.
"Running" by Evermore – (Top 24)
"Walk Away Renée" by Rick Price – (Top 12) Bottom 2
"I Still Haven't Found What I'm Looking For" by U2 – (Top 11)
"Black Fingernails, Red Wine" by Eskimo Joe – (Top 10) Bottom 2
"Thank You for the Music" by ABBA – (Top 9)
"Slide" by Goo Goo Dolls – (Top 8) Bottom 3
"Ain't No Mountain High Enough" by Marvin Gaye & Tammi Terrell – (Top 7) Bottom 3
"You Can't Always Get What You Want" by The Rolling Stones – (Top 6) Bottom 3
"Billie Jean" by Michael Jackson – (Top 5)
"No Such Thing" by John Mayer – (Top 4)
"What Goes Around.../...Comes Around" by Justin Timberlake – (Top 4) Eliminated 10 November 2008

Chrislyn Hamilton
Chrislyn Hamilton is a 17-year-old from Scarborough, Queensland. Before her audition, Chrislyn Hamilton was in high school and was the lead singer in her school band, picked up a leading role in her school musical and performed in a gospel rock choir group every week. Hamilton was eliminated during the Top 5 results night, and for the first time, the contest was left with four male finalists.
"Proud Mary" by Tina Turner – (Top 24)
"Think" by Aretha Franklin – (Top 12) TOUCHDOWN! (from Kyle Sandilands)
"True Colours" by Cyndi Lauper – (Top 11)
"Chains" by Tina Arena – (Top 10)
"Mamma Mia" by ABBA – (Top 9) Bottom 3
"Don't Speak" by No Doubt – (Top 8)
"Get Ready" by Temptations – (Top 7) TOUCHDOWN! (from Guy Sebastian)
"Get off of My Cloud" by The Rolling Stones – (Top 6)
"Thriller" by Michael Jackson – (Top 5) Eliminated 3 November 2008

Roshani Priddis
Roshani Priddis (born August 1987) is a 21-year-old from Ashfield, New South Wales, although she grew up in Tamworth, New South Wales. Born in Sri Lanka, Priddis moved to Australia as a 6-week-old when she was adopted by an Australian family. Priddis was eliminated during the Top 6 results night. 

"Knock on Wood" by Eddie Floyd – (Top 24)
"If I Ain't Got You" by Alicia Keys – (Wildcard)
"Tell Me 'bout It" by Joss Stone – (Top 12)
"What's Love Got To Do With It" by Tina Turner – (Top 11)
"Heading in the Right Direction" by Renée Geyer – (Top 10)
"Money, Money, Money" by ABBA – (Top 9) Bottom 2
"The Pretender" by Foo Fighters – (Top 8)
"Reflections" by Diana Ross & The Supremes – (Top 7)
"Wild Horses" by The Rolling Stones – (Top 6) Eliminated 27 October 2008

Sophie Paterson
Sophie Paterson is a 23-year-old from London, United Kingdom. Originally from Maryknoll, Victoria, Paterson moved to England to pursue a music career. Before she auditioned, Sophie Paterson worked as a bar manager and performed regularly. She was eliminated during the Top 7 results night.
"(I Can't Get No) Satisfaction" by The Rolling Stones – (Top 24)
"I'm Yours" by Jason Mraz – (Wildcard)
"Mr. Jones" by Counting Crows – (Top 12) Bottom 3
"Sweet Dreams" by Eurythmics – (Top 11) Bottom 2
"Don't Hold Back" by The Potbelleez – (Top 10)
"Gimme! Gimme! Gimme!" by ABBA – (Top 9)
"Ana's Song (Open Fire)" by Silverchair – (Top 8) Bottom 2
"Papa Was A Rolling Stone" by Temptations – (Top 7) Eliminated 20 October 2008

Thanh Bui
Thanh Bui is a 25-year-old from Abbotsford, Victoria. Born in Adelaide, South Australia, to Vietnamese parents, he moved to Melbourne as a 7-year-old. He was educated at Melbourne High School, graduating in 2000. Thanh Bui was part of the boy-band North who toured around Malaysia and split up in 2006. Aside of Australian Idol he is the director and vocal coach at International Artist Academy. Bui was eliminated during the Top 8 Results Night. 
"One" by U2 – (Top 24)
"This Love" by Maroon 5 – (Top 12)
"Every Breath You Take" by The Police – (Top 11) Bottom 3
"You're the Voice" by John Farnham – (Top 10)
"The Winner Takes It All" by ABBA – (Top 9) TOUCHDOWN! (from Marcia Hines)
"Shadow of the Day" by Linkin Park – (Top 8) – Eliminated 13 October 2008

Madam Parker
Madam Parker is a 23-year-old who lives with her family in Beverly Hills, New South Wales. Originally from New Zealand, Parker moved to Australia in order to make a better future for her son and pursue her musical dreams. Parker is of Māori and West African descent. Parker was eliminated during the Top 9 Results Night. In April 2010, it was announced that Madam will be a new member of the Young Divas group, replacing former member, Emily Williams.
"No One" by Alicia Keys – (Top 24)
"Closer" by Ne-Yo – (Top 12)
"Upside Down" by Diana Ross – (Top 11)
"Hook Me Up" by The Veronicas – (Top 10) Bottom 3
"Dancing Queen" by ABBA – (Top 9) – Eliminated 6 October 2008

Jack Anton

Jack Anton (born 10 December 1991) is a 25-year-old from Melbourne, Victoria. At 15-months-old, Jack Anton had a heart condition. Before the auditions, he attended high school . Anton was eliminated during the Top 10 Results Night. Jack joined a band from Melbourne named at Sunset in March 2014, but he left to focus on solo music in June 2016. The band was also renamed to 'Lynk'.

"You Raise Me Up" by Josh Groban – (Top 24)
"I Don't Want to Miss a Thing" by Aerosmith – (Top 12)
"Uptown Girl" by Billy Joel – (Top 11)
"Light Surrounding You" by Evermore – (Top 10) – Eliminated 29 September 2008

Brooke Addamo
Brooke Addamo is a 25-year-old from Werribee, Victoria. Addamo takes professional vocal coaching and won Teen Idol in 2007. She was eliminated during the Top 11 Results Night. She has now released an E.P. with Wunderkind (Warner Music) under the moniker "Owl Eyes" which is in stores now.
"Foolish Games" by Jewel – (Top 24)
"These Words" by Natasha Bedingfield – (Top 12)
"Bette Davis Eyes" by Kim Carnes – (Top 11) – Eliminated 22 September 2008

Jonny Taylor

Jonny Taylor is a 22-year-old from Perth, Western Australia. Since 2006, Taylor has been determined to make his life count after a serious motorcycle accident almost took his life. He was eliminated during the Top 12 Results Night.
"Hound Dog" by Elvis Presley – (Top 24)
"Let Her Cry" by Hootie & the Blowfish – (Wildcard)
"Better Man" by Pearl Jam – (Top 12) – Eliminated 15 September 2008

Elimination chart

Result Night Performances

Guest Performances

Grand Finale 
The Grand Finale occurred on 23 November at the Sydney Opera House. The 2008 finale unlike previous finales was held outside the Sydney Opera House rather than inside the building.

Grand Finale performances

Ratings

References

External links
Official website
Official Facebook
Inside Australian Idol 
Australian Idol 2008 Blog
Australian Idol 2008 Feature from news.com.au
 

Australian Idol
2008 Australian television seasons